Portageville may refer to:
 Portageville, New York 
 Portageville Viaduct, train bridge
 Portageville, Missouri